Ariana Jacob is an artist based in Portland, Oregon, in the United States. Her art work is conversation-based and invites people to reflect on their political identity.

Biography
Jacob worked as an assistant to Mierle Laderman Ukeles in New York before relocating to Portland, Oregon. She received her MFA in Art & Social Practice at Portland State University in 2010.

Work
Jacob's work has been presented in the NW Biennial at the Tacoma Art Museum, Disjecta's Portland 2012 Biennial, The Open Engagement Conference, and the Discourse and Discord Symposium at the Walker Art Center.

In 2013, her project "As you make your bed so you must lie in it" took place at the Portland Building, supported by the Regional Arts & Culture Council Project Grant. This participatory installation invited people onto a bed with her to talk about and edit the American Constitution.

In 2016, Jacob and Ralph Pugay created S.A.D park on Pioneer Courthouse Square as part of a Houseguest Residency. The interactive installation was created as an attempt to help with seasonal affective disorder through exposing people to bright lights, programming guided meditations and puppy playtimes.

References

External links
 
  (Portland Art Museum, July 3, 2012)
  (The Smart Museum of Art at the University of Chicago, March 5, 2015)
  (Open Engagement May 18, 2014)

Living people
20th-century American women artists
21st-century American women artists
Artists from Portland, Oregon
American conceptual artists
Women conceptual artists
Modern artists
Portland State University alumni
Year of birth missing (living people)
Place of birth missing (living people)